Derek Hayes (born 8 December 1977 in Dungannon) is a British former race driver from Northern Ireland who competed in various series including Formula Palmer Audi, Formula 3 Euroseries, NASCAR Busch Series and British Formula 3. In the latter, he won one race at Brands Hatch on 8 July 2001. He also took part in the 2001 Masters of Formula 3 race. Hayes stopped racing full time after 2004 but returned to karting for the Dan Wheldon Memorial Kart Race in 2011.

References

Racing drivers from Northern Ireland
1977 births
Living people
ASCAR drivers
Carlin racing drivers
Manor Motorsport drivers
Team West-Tec drivers